Liubar is an urban-type settlement in Zhytomyr Raion, Zhytomyr Oblast, Ukraine. Population:

History
According to historical and archaeological data, Liubar is the possible location of the ancient Ruthenian city of Bolokhov. In the 13th century, the Bolokhov land was devastated by the military campaigns of Daniel of Galicia as well as Mongol raids. 

In the 14th century, Lithuanian prince Lubart built a fortress on the Sluch River, which was named in his honour. Since 1387, the location belonged to the Grand Duchy of Lithuania. After 1569, the settlement, known in Polish as Lubartów, was divided between the Kyiv and Volhynian Voivodeship of the Crown of Poland. At the time, it was controlled by prince Constantine Ostrozky and received Magdeburg rights. Since 1623, Liubar belonged to the Polish Lubomirski family.

A Jewish community lived in Liubar for centuries. A wooden synagogue was erected in 1491. It was destroyed during pogroms perpetrated by the Cossacks in the middle of the 17th century.

In 1660, the Battle of Liubar took place between Polish-Tatar and Muscovite-Cossack forces. In 1792, during the Polish-Russian War, the Battle of Boruszkowce took place near the town.

In 1793 - 1917 it was a town in Novograd-Volynsky Uyezd in Volhynian Governorate of the Russian Empire.

At the end of the 19th century, the Jewish inhabitants represent 43% of the total population. 9 synagogues, a Jewish theater, a Jewish hospital and many shops are own by member of the community. 

During the Ukrainian War of Independence in 1918, Liubar was occupied by the Red Army, which was later expelled by the German forces. In 1919, the town was fought over by Soviet forces and the Directory of Ukraine. In late 1919, Liubar was occupied by the Second Polish Republic.
In 1920, the soldiers of the 1st Cavalry Army (a formation of the Red Army) perpetrated a pogrom killing about 60 people and hurting 180. After the end of the war, the town became part of Soviet Ukraine.

A local newspaper was published in Liubar since August 1931. During the Holodomor of 1932-1933, numerous people died of hunger in the region.

On July 6, 1941, Wehrmacht occupied this town. Germans sent the Jews into a ghetto. In August 1941, mass executions killed around 300 people in the nearby forest. On September, around 1 300 Jews from the city and surroundings villages are murdered by an Einsatzgruppen including Ukrainians Hilfspolizei.

In January 1989 the population was 2656 people

After Liubar became part of independent Ukraine in 1991, an art school, a stadium and a youth sports school were opened in the settlement. Starting from 1994, the district was attached to gas pipeline

In January 2013 the population was 2179 people.

In 2016, a memorial plaque to the victims of the Holocaust was installed in Liubar.

Notable people
 Aron Vergelis (1918-1999) - Soviet Yiddish writer and poet.
 Valeriy Kharchyshyn (1974) - leader of the Druha Rika rock band.

References

Urban-type settlements in Zhytomyr Raion
Zhytomyr Raion
Volhynian Voivodeship (1569–1795)
Cossack Hetmanate
Novograd-Volynsky Uyezd
Jewish Ukrainian history
Holocaust locations in Ukraine